Dominic Mulvany (born 1956) is a singer-songwriter from Dublin who has released a number of singles and albums, mainly via his 'Kish' record label, since the 1980s.

His career commenced with the release of "In The City / Your Smile is on My Mind" in 1981 (on Kish). With 'Ibiza', his follow-up single (released on Vixen records), he attained very large amounts of airplay in Ireland; this in turn led to several high-profile TV appearances (including RTÉ's Kenny Live show and Nighthawks).

Further singles followed, including one produced by Arsenal and Irish International football player John Devine: "Travelling People".

Dominic has released three albums: Stranger on My Highway (1985), Vagabond Moon (1990) and Diving for Pearls (2004). The last of these was produced by Irish singer-songwriter Chris Singleton, whom Dominic taught piano. Dominic also engineered some of Chris Singleton's early material – an album called 'Start'.

Discography
In The City / Your Smile is on My Mind – 7" Single, Double A-Side, 16 May 1981.  Kish Records K001

Ibiza / There I Go Again – 7" Single, 3 August 1982.  Vixen Records FM004

Hello, I've Come to Say Goodbye / Stephen's Green – 7" Single, 14 January 1983.  Vixen Records FM007

Into Your Love Again / If There was Something I Could Say – 7" Single, 4 June 1983.  Vixen Records FM009

Watching The Northern Lights / Stranger on My Mind – 7" Single, 22 February 1984.  Vixen Records

Travelling People / She's Late in Arriving – 7" Single, 19 August 1986.  Kish Records K002

Vagabond Moon / From a Seaside Town – 7" Single, 3 October 1990.  Kish Records K003

External links
 Official Dominic Mulvany site
 Dominic Mulvany's Myspace page

1956 births
Living people
Irish male singers
Irish songwriters